Gdym is a rural locality (a selo) in Akhtynsky District, Republic of Dagestan, Russia. The population was 388 as of 2010. There are 2 streets.

Geography 
Gdym is located on the Gdymchay River, 35 km southwest of Akhty (the district's administrative centre) by road. Fiy is the nearest rural locality.

References 

Rural localities in Akhtynsky District